Concepcion, officially the Municipality of Concepcion,  is a 3rd class municipality in the province of Iloilo, Philippines. According to the 2020 census, it has a population of 44,633 people.

It was the capital of the Comandancia de Concepcion, a unit equivalent to a sub-province headed by a Corregidor, before it was merged with the Province of Iloilo.

History 
Concepcion was originally known as Bacjawan, which means "the place of the bacjaw trees," which used to grow in large numbers along the coast's swampy areas. It was formally founded as a pueblo (town) in 1855. The town was later renamed to Concepcion, in honor of the first born daughter of Felizardo Azucena, the town's first captain basal, or gobernadorcillo.

In 1857, the Comandancia de Concepción (Military District of Concepcion) was created. It was a sub-province in Northern Iloilo composed of the capital town of Concepcion, Ajuy, Balasan (modern-day Batad, Estancia, and Balasan), Lemery, San Dionisio, and Sara. It was abolished on April 11, 1901, when the Americans took control of the Philippines and established the civil government of Iloilo. In present days, the former Comandancia de Concepción covers the 5th legislative district of Iloilo except for the towns of Barotac Viejo and San Rafael.

Geography
Concepcion is located on the north-eastern part of Panay Island (known as the mainland), together with some 16 other, smaller, associated islands.  It is bounded on the north by the municipality of San Dionisio, in the south by the municipality of Ajuy, in the west by the municipality of Sara, and in the east by the Visayan Sea. It has a total land area of 9,702.04 hectares.

Climate

Barangays
Concepcion is politically subdivided into twenty-five barangays, eleven of which are island barangays, and fourteen of which are on the mainland (Panay Island).

Demographics

Economy 

The primary industry of the people of Concepcion is in fishing. The Visayan Sea, where Concepcion is situated, is one of the most prolific in fish production and provides a significant proportion of fish in the region. In 2007, the number of registered fishermen stood at 7,957. Fishing is followed second by farming, with much of it being subsistence farming. The principle cash crops are rice, corn and vegetables, along with bamboo and coconuts.  Poultry and livestock are raised for local consumption.

Poverty incidence was extremely high in the early 21st century, with 87% of the population being below the government poverty line in 2000, with a reduction to 47% in 2004. A contributing factor was the rapidity of population growth in the municipality, with a growth rate of 2.76% in 2002, or four babies being born every day in the municipality.

Education
There is one institution of higher learning in the municipality, Northern Iloilo State University (NISU: Concepcion), which offers bachelor's degrees in fisheries and agriculture, as well as a master's in public administration.

Tourism 
Concepcion is a host to beautiful islands with white sand beaches and sandbars. Among them are Bulobadiangan Island, Agho Island, and Pan de Azucar.

Culture
The annual Tampisaw Festival, held the fourth week of April on four of the islands, attracts tourism.

Notable personalities

 Paulino Alcantara (1896-1964), Filipino footballer for FC Barcelona

Concepcion Power Station
The Concepcion Power Station is a 270-megawatt (MW) coal-fired power plant located by the coast of Barangay Nipa, Concepcion, Iloilo. The plant is sponsored by the Palm Concepcion Power Corporation (PCPC),  a subsidiary of real estate company A Brown Company. Currently Unit 1 of the station has begun operating since August 2016 while Unit 2 is planned for 2019.

References

External links

 Official Homepage
 [ Philippine Standard Geographic Code]
 Philippine Census Information
 Local Governance Performance Management System

Municipalities of Iloilo
Former sub-provinces of the Philippines